The following is the discography of Don Giovanni Records, an independent punk label based in New Brunswick, New Jersey. In addition to music the label also publishes books and artist books.

Releases

Books published by Don Giovanni Records

References

Discographies of American record labels
Don Giovanni Records